"Road Trip" is a song recorded by Swedish group De Vet Du. The song was released as a digital download in Sweden on 26 February 2017 and peaked at number 9 on the Swedish Singles Chart. It is taking part in Melodifestivalen 2017, and qualified to andra chansen from the first semi-final on 4 February 2017. The song was written by Johan Gunterberg and Christopher Martland.

Track listing

Chart performance

Weekly charts

Release history

References

2017 singles
2016 songs
Swedish-language songs
Melodifestivalen songs of 2017
Swedish pop songs
Universal Music Group singles